Mary Immaculate of Lourdes Church, also referred to as St. Mary's,  is a Roman Catholic parish of the Archdiocese of Boston located in Newton, Massachusetts. Its pastor is Father Charles J. Higgins. The parish is known locally as one of the few Boston parishes to offer the Tridentine Mass.

History 
St. Mary's is the first catholic parish in the city of Newton established  in 1870 before the erection of a Gothic revival wooden chapel Catholics in Newton worshiped in private houses eventually they rented out a Hall. Until 1867 when the first chapel was built on Eillot Street. Eventually the parish outgrew their church so in 1909 Edward T. P. Graham was hired to build the church on Eillot street today it was then that the church was rededicated to Mary Immaculate of Lourdes.

In 2004 the Archdiocese had put Mary Immaculate on the closing list of churches. However, in 2006 the Cardinal had reconsidered his plan to close the church and decided to close St. Phillip's Church in Waban instead. He moved the Tridentine Mass from Holy Trinity Church in the South End of Boston to Mary Immaculate of Lourdes saving the 149 year old parish from near extinction.

Architecture 
The church is designed in the Romanesque style with Italianate features.

Mass times 

Holy Days: as announced

List of pastors

Vocations

Diocesan priests/deacons 
 Rev. Michael E. Begley, deceased
 Rev. William S. Carpenger
 Rev. Richard F. Cronin
 Rev. Msgr. Edmund Daley, deceased
 Rev. William J. Melea
 Rev. Joseph Meredith, deceased
 Rev. Thomas F. Motherway, deceased
 Rev. Msgr. Francis J. Murphy
 Rev. Msgr. John E. Murphy
 Rev. Robert F. Reardon
 Rev. Bernard J. Smith, deceased
 Rev. John E. Sheridan
 Deacon George Messinger

Religious priests

Religious sisters

References

External links
Parish Gallery

Roman Catholic churches in Massachusetts
Churches in Newton, Massachusetts